A range of local government and legal positions are filled by regular elections in Montgomery County, Ohio.

County Board of Commissioners
Montgomery County is governed by a three-member county commission. As of October 2012, the board comprises three Democratic members: Debbie Lieberman, Judy Dodge, and Dan Foley.  Former Montgomery County Sheriff Dave Vore, a Republican will challenge incumbent Dodge in November 2012.  Lieberman will seek re-election against Kettering City Council member Ashley Webb.

Term Commencing Jan. 2, 2001, 2005, etc.

Term Commencing Jan. 3, 2001, 2005, etc.

Term Commencing Jan. 1, 2007

County Prosecutor
The county prosecutor of Montgomery County, elected for a four-year term.

County Auditor
The county auditor of Montgomery County, elected for a four-year term.

Clerk of Courts
The clerk of courts of Montgomery County, elected for a four-year term.

Sheriff
The sheriff of Montgomery County, elected for a four-year term.

Recorder
The county recorder of Montgomery County, elected for a four-year term.

Treasurer
The county treasurer of Montgomery County, elected for a four-year term.

Engineer
The county engineer of Montgomery County, elected for a four-year term.

Coroner
The coroner of Montgomery County, elected for a four-year term.

Common Pleas Court Judges
Judges of the Montgomery County Court of Common Pleas are elected for four-year terms. There are currently 11 general division judges, two domestic relations division judges, one juvenile division judge, and one probate division judge.

Term Commencing Jan. 1, 2003

Term Commencing Jan. 2, 2003

Term Commencing Jan. 3, 2003

Term Commencing July 1, 2003

Term Commencing July 2, 2003

Term Commencing Jan. 3, 2005

Domestic Relations Division, Term Commencing Jan. 2, 2001

Domestic Relations Division, Term Commencing Jan. 4, 2001

Juvenile Division, Term Commencing Jan. 1, 2001

Juvenile Division, Term Commencing Jan. 5, 2005

Probate Division, Term Commencing Feb. 9, 2003

County Court Judges
Judges of the Montgomery County, County Court are elected for four-year terms. They act as the municipal judges for cities in Montgomery County that have not created their own municipal courts.

Term Commencing Jan. 1, 2001

Term Commencing Jan. 1, 2001

Term Commencing Jan. 3, 2005

Term Commencing Jan. 1, 2005

Term Commencing Jan. 2, 2005

References 

 Montgomery County Sheriff's Office

Montgomery County